Chukka boots are ankle-high leather boots with suede or leather uppers, leather or rubber soles, and open lacing, with two or three pairs of eyelets. The name chukka possibly comes from the game of polo, where a chukka is a period of play.

Generally, "chukka boot" refers to a form of desert boots originally worn by British soldiers in the Western Desert Campaign of World War II.

Materials and style 
Chukkas are usually made from calfskin or suede, although they can be made from other materials. The style first became popular in the late 1940s through the 1960s as casual wear. In the 21st century, chukkas persist as a popular menswear shoe, particularly in the United Kingdom. They can be worn with both suits and more casual wear like jeans.

According to shoe historian June Swann, the essential chukka boot is ankle-high, open-laced, and unlined, with two to four pairs of eyelets, thin leather soles, calfskin suede uppers in two parts (each from a single piece of leather; quarters sewn on top of vamp), and rounded toes.

Desert boot

A desert boot is a chukka boot with crepe rubber soles and, typically, suede uppers. Desert boots were popularized in the 1950s by UK shoe company C. & J. Clark.

Desert boots were officially introduced to the world with the debut of the Clarks' Desert Boot at the 1949 Chicago Shoe Fair. After feature coverage in Esquire magazine, their popularity took off. According to Clarks, inspiration came from "the crepe-soled, rough suede boots made in Cairo's Khan el-Khalili bazaar for British Eighth Army officers."

These boots were based on the South African veldskoen which became a popular footwear item in Southern Africa due to their robust and simple design. Often being bought by soldiers for use in the various bush wars of the region, they have become popular across the world as "desert boots".

See also
Desert Combat Boot

References

Boots